Lighthouse keepers are people who keep watch at a lighthouse.

Lighthouse Keepers may also refer to:

 Lighthouse Keepers (band), an Australian country and indie pop band
 "The Lighthouse Keeper", a 2020 song by Sam Smith
 The Lighthouse Keepers (novel), a 2008 book in Adrian McKinty's Lighthouse trilogy
 The Lighthouse Keepers (film), a 1929 French silent drama film